Copelatus spoliatus is a species of diving beetle. It is part of the subfamily Copelatinae in the family Dytiscidae. It was described by Félix Guignot in 1955.

References

spoliatus
Beetles described in 1955